The 1995 African Cup of Champions Clubs was the 31st edition of the annual international club football competition held in the CAF region (Africa), the African Cup of Champions Clubs. It determined that year's club champion of association football in Africa.

Orlando Pirates from South Africa won that final, and became for the first time CAF club champion.

Preliminary round

|}

First round

|}

Dragons de l'Ouémé withdrew.

Second round

|}
1 The match was abandoned at 70' with Mbilinga FC leading 4–0, after Real Banjul walked off the pitch to protest the officiating. Real Banjul were ejected from the competition and banned from CAF competitions for one year.

Quarter-finals

|}

Semi-finals

|}

Final

Champion

Top scorers

The top scorers from the 1995 African Cup of Champions Clubs are as follows:

References
African Club Competitions 1995 - rsssf.com

1
African Cup of Champions Clubs